Amreh (also known as Amrī) is a village in Kolijan Rostaq-e Olya Rural District, Kolijan Rostaq District, Sari County, Mazandaran Province, Iran. At the 2006 census, its population was 2,408, in 674 families.

References

External links

Populated places in Sari County